Herbert B. Hammond (December 5, 1939 – July 23, 2009) was an American ice hockey coach and scout who led Brown for six seasons before beginning a professional career in the NHL. Hammond started coaching at Oswego State in 1968 and remained there for 12 years before moving on to Plattsburgh State. He took the Cardinals to the NCAA Division II National Title Game both years he was there (Losing to Lowell each time) and soon was offered the head coaching job at Brown. After six poor years Hammond left to become an NHL scout for 17 years and had his name etched on the Stanley Cup as part of the New York Rangers win in 1994 Stanley Cup Finals. Hammond died in 2009 after a long fight with cancer.

Head coaching record

References

External links
 
 Herb Hammond's coaching record at College Hockey News
 Herb Hammond's career statistics at Elite Prospects

1939 births
2009 deaths
American ice hockey coaches
Brown Bears men's ice hockey coaches
Sportspeople from Boston
Ice hockey people from Massachusetts
Ice hockey coaches from Massachusetts